Chin Chiu-Yueh (born 1 February 1968) is an archer who represented Chinese Taipei.

Archery

Chin finished 27th at the 1988 Summer Olympic Games in the women's individual event. She also finished eleventh in the women's team event as part of the Chinese Taipei team as part of the Chinese Taipei team.

She won a silver medal in the freestyle women's individual event at the 1991 World Indoor Archery Championships.

References

External links 
 Profile on worldarchery.org

1968 births
Living people
Taiwanese female archers
Olympic archers of Taiwan
Archers at the 1988 Summer Olympics
World Archery Championships medalists
Archers at the 1990 Asian Games
Asian Games medalists in archery
Asian Games silver medalists for Chinese Taipei
Medalists at the 1990 Asian Games